is a Buddhist temple in Higashiyama-ku in Kyoto, Japan. Tōfuku-ji takes its name from two temples in Nara, Tōdai-ji and Kōfuku-ji. It is one of the Kyoto Gozan or "five great Zen temples of Kyoto".

History
Tōfuku-ji was founded in 1236 by the imperial chancellor Kujō Michiie.  He appointed the monk Enni as founding priest, who had studied Rinzai Zen Buddhism in China under the monk Wuzhun Shifan. The temple was burned but rebuilt in the 15th century according to original plans.  Tofuku-ji was one of the five temples of the Five Mountain System.

The temple was greatly reduced in size from 70 buildings to 25 during the Meiji era after the Shinbutsu bunri decree. In 1881, a fire burned down many major buildings such as the Main Hall, the Hōjo, the Hattō and the statue of Sakyamuni Buddha. During the Russo-Japanese War , the temple area was requisitioned and became a prisoner-of-war camp for Russians.

Both the main hall and the Hattō were rebuilt in 1917, and a new statue of Sakyamuni Buddha was later relocated to the temple in 1934.

Abbots
In 1486 Ryōan Keigo became the 171st abbot of Tōfuku-ji.  At the end of the 16th century Ankokuji Ekei was appointed abbot.  From 1980 to 2009 Tōfuku-ji has been led by head abbot Keidō Fukushima.

Architecture

Tōfuku-ji's main gate is the oldest sanmon in Japan. It is a National Treasure of Japan. It is two stories high and five bays wide. The central three bays are doors.

Currently, the Tōfuku-ji complex includes 24 sub-temples, though in the past the number has been as high as 53.

The complex includes Japan's oldest communal toilet, which was built in the first half of the muromachi period. In October 2022, a car crashed through and damaged the wooden doors and supporting pillars at the entrance to the toilet.

Artwork
Tōfuku-ji's large nehan-zu painting depicts Buddha on his death bed.  This massive image (7 x 14 meters) is the second largest in Japan.  The image at nearby Sennyū-ji is the largest of its kind in Japan, measuring 8 x 16 meters. Both images are rarely displayed, most recently in 2003 for three days only.

A 1238 portrait painting of Wuzhun Shifan along with an inscription by an anonymous author was brought to the temple by Enni in the 1240s and remains there today.  Plaques of Wuzhun's calligraphy is also kept at Tōfuku-ji.

In 1933 the Nihonga painter Inshō Dōmoto painted the large and vivid "Blue Dragon" ceiling painting for one of the halls, which he painted in 17 days.

Garden

There are a number of gardens in the various precincts of Tōfuku-ji.
The current garden was designed by landscape architect Mirei Shigemori in the 1930s. The moss garden in particular has been emblematic of the renewal of Japanese gardening principles in the 20th Century.

The temple features a large number of Japanese maple trees, and is most crowded during the autumn season when people flock to see the autumn foliage.  It is a tradition to view the leaves from the Tsūten-kyō bridge.

Images

See also
Zen
Enni
Wuzhun Shifan
List of Buddhist temples
List of Buddhist temples in Kyoto
List of National Treasures of Japan (temples)
List of National Treasures of Japan (paintings)
List of National Treasures of Japan (writings)
 For an explanation of terms concerning Japanese Buddhism, Japanese Buddhist art, and Japanese Buddhist temple architecture, see the Glossary of Japanese Buddhism.

Notes

References 
 Baroni, Helen Josephine. (2002).  The Illustrated Encyclopedia of Zen Buddhism. New York: Rosen Publishing Group. ; OCLC 42680558
 Dumoulin, Heinrich. (2005).  Zen Buddhism: A History (Vol. II: Japan). Bloomington, Indiana: World Wisdom. 
 Fukushima, Keidō and Fumi Dan. (2006). Tōfukuji. Kyoto: Tankōsha. ; 
 Harris, Ishwar C. and Jeff Shore. (2004).  The Laughing Buddha of Tofukuji: The Life of Zen Master Keidō Fukushima. Bloomington, Indiana: World Wisdom. ; OCLC 56051074
 Ponsonby-Fane, Richard Arthur Brabazon. (1956). Kyoto: The Old Capital of Japan, 794-1869. Kyoto: The Ponsonby Memorial Society.

Further reading

External links 
 Tōfuku-ji official web site
  Kyoto Prefectural Tourism Guide:  Tōfuku-ji
 Joint Council for Japanese Rinzai and Obaku Zen: Tōfuku-ji
 Buddhist Travel: Tōfuku-ji
 Pictures of Tōfuku-ji

Buddhist temples in Kyoto Prefecture
Gardens in Kyoto Prefecture
1230s establishments in Japan
1236 establishments in Asia
National Treasures of Japan
Tōfuku-ji temples
Rinzai temples
Important Cultural Properties of Japan
13th-century Buddhist temples
Zen gardens